Victor Dethier (23 March 1892 – 23 April 1963) was a Belgian racing cyclist. He won the Belgian national road race title in 1914.

References

External links

1892 births
1963 deaths
Belgian male cyclists
Sportspeople from Liège
Cyclists from Liège Province